The Band of the Grenadier Guards is one of the bands in the British Army.

History 

In 1685 Charles II allowed the band to maintain 12 "hautbois" (oboe) players. His death in 1685 was so significant for the band that until the Second World War, the Bass Drummer (known officially as The Regimental Timebeater), wore a black armband in mourning of the king's death.

The Band was given the freedom of the City of Lincoln on 8 May 2008.

The March The British Grenadiers is one of the most recognizable and memorable tunes in the world, part of Britain's musical heritage. One of the band's admirers during the 18th century was George Frideric Handel. He demonstrated this by presenting the march from Scipio to the regiment before he included it in his opera of that name when it was first performed in 1726. George II gave Handel the task of scoring the Music for the Royal Fireworks, most commonly performed with strings, for the king's own musicians, who were wind players from his foot guards. Handel would have likely come into contact with musicians from the Grenadier Guards during the first performance at Vauxhall Gardens in 1749.

Band membership duties 
Musicians currently in the band have secondary roles in the British Army as chemical decontamination assistants, medics and drivers.

The band is based at Wellington Barracks in St James's, London.

Key personnel 
 Director of Music: Captain Ben Mason
 Bandmaster: WO1 Jonathan Rockey
 Band Sergeant Major: WO2 Chris Day

Historical key personnel 
 Lt. Dan(iel) Godfrey MVO (1831–1903), bandmaster (1856–1896)

Ensembles 

There are several ensembles within the Band of the Grenadier Guards:
 Concert Band
 Marching band
 Dance band
 Big Band
 Fanfare Trumpet Team
 18th Century Ensemble

Other ensembles include:
 Orchestras
 These include a range from a String Quartet, to a Chamber Orchestra
 Dinner Trios and Quartets also number among the band's ensembles.

Events 
The Band of the Grenadier Guards plays regularly for many events. Some of these occasions that are most famous are listed below, although this is not a comprehensive list.

 Beating Retreat
 Changing of the Guard
 The Festival of Remembrance
 Trooping the Colour
 Investitures
 State visits

The band also performs at other non-military events such as Henley Regatta, Royal Ascot, the FA Cup Final and international rugby matches and opened the 2002 Commonwealth Games in Manchester. The Band of the Grenadier Guards also visits schools to take part in musical concerts and workshops.

See also 
 Coldstream Guards Band
 Irish Guards Band
 Scots Guards Band
 Welsh Guards Band
 Household Division

References

External links 
 Home of Grenadier Guards Band

Video clips 
 Being given the Freedom of the City of Lincoln in May 2008

British ceremonial units
Royal Corps of Army Music
Grenadier Guards